The Ringwood Waldorf School is a private alternative school standing on the borders of Dorset and Hampshire, with classes ranging from Kindergarten to the Upper school. It educates according to the principles of  Steiner Waldorf Education and has an enrollment of over 240 students.

History
The school was founded in 1974 by Christine Polyblank on receiving a letter in which Alex Baum of the Camphill Sheiling Schools requested her to start a Waldorf school for the children of their co-workers. It began in a row of labourers' cottages – "Folly Farm" –and opened with six pupils. New teachers and pupils rapidly joined the school and it had to move into temporary buildings.

After 1980, the school began to develop its high school and by 1988 planned and built its own buildings on the piece of land where it now stands, Folly Farm, that it received from the Sheiling Trust.

Campus
Today the school has a modern purpose-built campus designed by Keir Polyblank, the husband of founder Christine Polyblank. He took responsibility for almost all aspects of the new build; the design, planning permission, four kindergartens, 12 classrooms, an art studio, science lab and multi-purpose hall besides some dedicated rooms for special activities such as Music, Handwork, Woodwork and Eurythmy.

Curriculum
Practice in the school is derived from the educational and social indications given by Rudolf Steiner (1861–1925). While it functions as an autonomous school, it is a full member of the Steiner Waldorf Schools Fellowship in the United Kingdom (the Fellowship) and follows the Code of Practice developed by that body. Parent and Child groups welcome children from 6 months, Kindergartens from 3 to 6 years, Lower School from 6 to 14 years and Upper School from 14 to 18 years.

The social practices of the school (including the financial principles) are based on the Social threefolding as developed by Rudolf Steiner, which are integrated into the educational aims and inform the management practices in the school.

Extracurricular activities

Comenius School Partnership Programme
Supported and funded by the British Council and the European Commission, this is a two-year project in which the school invites foreign teachers and students to a programme of activities. Ringwood pupils also visit schools in Spain, Germany, Italy, Turkey and Estonia to learn drama, circus skills and sculpture.

International Summer School
The school teams up with the Lewis School of English to offer an International Summer School. It is based at the Ringwood Waldorf School and offers purpose-built classrooms, a large theatre, gymnasium, workshops for dance, arts and craft activities and access to nearby fields and forest and to Ringwood, a historic market town on the edge of the New Forest National Park.

References

External links
 
 Ringwood Waldorf School 2014 promotional video
 Steiner Schools Fellowship

Waldorf schools in the United Kingdom
Private schools in Dorset
Educational institutions established in 1974
1974 establishments in England